Shahnaz Rahmatullah (2 January 1952 – 23 March 2019) was a Bangladeshi singer. Her notable songs are Ekbar Jete De Na Amar Chotto Sonar Gaye, Je Chilo Drishtir Shimanay and Ek Tara Tui Desher Kotha. She was the recipient of the Ekushey Padak in 1992 and Bangladesh National Film Award for Best Female Playback Singer for the film Chhutir Phande (1990).

Background

Rahmatullah was born on 2 January 1952 as Shahnaz Begum in Dhaka to M Fazlul Haq and Asiya Haq. Actor Zafar Iqbal and music director Anwar Parvez were Rahmatullah's brothers. She got trained by ghazal maestro Mehedi Hassan, Ustad Phul Mohammad, Ustad Munir Hossain and Altaf Mahmud.

Rahmatullah was married to Maj (retd) Abul Bashar Rahmatullah.

Career
Rahmatullah debuted in singing at the age of 11, as a playback singer for the film Notun Sur (1963). She first performed on television in 1964. She sang in Bangladeshi and Pakistani films. She mostly sang modern (Adhunik Gaan) and patriotic songs. In the late 1960s and early 1970s, she sang patriotic songs such as Sohni Dharti Allah Rakhe and Jeevay Jeevay Pakistan. She released an album with Samina Chowdhury called Megh Roddur on which she sang six songs composed by Shafiq Tuhin. She released four albums in total.

Four of Rahmatullah's songs were selected in a BBC survey of 20 greatest Bangla songs of all times.

Rahmatullah died on 23 March 2019 of a heart attack at her residence in Baridhara, aged 67.

Pakistani journalist, Hamid Mir said, "Shahnaz Begum passed away in Bangladesh on March 23 when many Pakistanis were listening to her famous song Sohni Dharti Allah Rakhay on Pakistan day."

Works
Films
 Notun Sur (1962)
 Abar Tora Manush Ho (1973)
 Ghuddi (1975)
Albums
 Badal Diner Pakhi

Film songs

Non-film songs

Songs for television

Awards
 President's Pride of Performance Medal (1965)
 Ekushey Padak (1992)
 Bangladesh National Film Award for Best Female Playback Singer (1990)
 Bangladesh Shilpakala Academy Award 
 Bangladesh Chalachitra Sangbadik Samity Award

References

External links
 

1952 births
2019 deaths
People from Dhaka
20th-century Bangladeshi women singers
20th-century Bangladeshi singers
Bangladeshi playback singers
Best Female Playback Singer National Film Award (Bangladesh) winners
Recipients of the Ekushey Padak
Burials at Banani Graveyard
Recipients of the Pride of Performance